Two ships of the Royal Navy have borne the name HMS Peony, after the flower:

  was an  sloop launched in 1915 and sold in 1919, becoming the mercantile Ardena.
  was a  launched in 1940 and transferred to the Royal Hellenic Navy in 1943 as Sachtouris.  She was returned in 1951 and scrapped in 1952.

Royal Navy ship names